Accomac is a community in Hellam Township, York County, Pennsylvania, on the south bank of the Susquehanna River. It is located at coordinates  at an elevation of 271 ft.

References

Unincorporated communities in York County, Pennsylvania
Unincorporated communities in Pennsylvania